Heavy Stereo were an English alternative rock band, who were active from 1993 to 1999. There were known for their 1970s glam rock styled sound, and their sole album, Déjà Voodoo. They were also on the same record label and opened for Oasis, which Heavy Stereo's frontman Gem Archer later joined.

Career
Heavy Stereo was fronted by lead vocalist, rhythm guitarist, songwriter and producer Gem Archer, later of Oasis. They were heavily influenced by 1970s glam rock, including Gary Glitter, The New York Dolls, and Sweet. They released their debut and only album, Deja Voodoo, in 1996. Heavy Stereo also produced a cover of The Jam's song The Gift, for the tribute album Fire & Skill. The band split up after Archer joined Oasis as a rhythm guitarist and keyboardist, replacing Paul "Bonehead" Arthurs for their Standing on the Shoulder of Giants Tour, and on all albums and tours afterwards until their breakup in 2009. Archer then began work on a new project with other members of Oasis, called Beady Eye, before joining Noel Gallagher's High Flying Birds.

Band members
Gem Archer – Lead vocals, rhythm guitar, piano
Craig "Nez" Naisbitt – Bass
Pete Downing – Lead guitar
Nick Jones – Drums, vocals, percussion

Discography

Albums
Déjà Voodoo (23 September 1996) – Charted at number 76 in the UK Albums Chart. All songs written by Gem Archer, and produced by Heavy Stereo, John Bell and Steve Orchard.

"Chinese Burn"
"Cartoon Moon"
"Déjà Voodoo"
"Tell Yer Ma"
"Crown of Thoughts"
"Mouse in a Hole"
"Bangers and Mash"
"Deep Fried Heart"
"Reaching for Heaven"
"Keep Up"
"Planet Empty"
"Shooting Star"

Chart singles
"Sleep Freak" (1995) – UK No. 46
"Smiler" (1995) – UK No. 46
"Chinese Burn" (1996) – UK No. 45
"Mouse in a Hole" (1996) – UK No. 53

See also
Fire and Skill: The Songs of the Jam

References

Musical groups established in 1993
English rock music groups
English alternative rock groups
Britpop groups
Creation Records artists
Musical quartets